The 1984–85 season was Heart of Midlothian F.C.s second consecutive season of play in the Scottish Premier Division. Hearts also competed in the Uefa Cup, Scottish Cup and the League Cup.

Fixtures

Friendlies

Uefa Cup

League Cup

Scottish Cup

Scottish Premier Division

Scottish Premier Division table

Squad information

|}

See also
List of Heart of Midlothian F.C. seasons

References 

 Statistical Record 84-85

External links 
 Official Club website

Heart of Midlothian F.C. seasons
Heart of Midlothian